Bohumil Tomášek (21 June 1936 – 2 November 2019) was a Czech basketball player and coach. He was voted to the Czechoslovakian 20th Century Team in 2001.

Playing career

Club career
Tomášek won two Czechoslovakian League championships, in the years 1960 and 1969. He also won the European-wide secondary level FIBA Saporta Cup championship, in the 1968–69 season. He was named to the FIBA European Selection Team in 1967. He was also the German League's top scorer, in the 1970–71 season.

National team career
With the senior Czechoslovakian national team, Tomášek competed in the men's tournament at the 1960 Summer Olympics. With Czechoslovakia, he also won the silver medal at the 1959 EuroBasket, and the silver medal at the 1967 EuroBasket.

Coaching career
Tomášek was a player-coach with the German League club SSV Hagen, from 1970 to 1972.

References

External links
FIBA Profile

1936 births
2019 deaths
Basketball players at the 1960 Summer Olympics
Czech basketball coaches
Czech men's basketball players
Olympic basketball players of Czechoslovakia
Sportspeople from Liberec

Basketball coaches
Czech basketball players
EuroBasket 1959